Martyrs of the Alamo (also known as The Birth of Texas) is a 1915 American historical war drama film written and directed by Christy Cabanne. The film is based on the historical novel of the same name by Theodosia Harris, and features an ensemble cast including Sam De Grasse, Douglas Fairbanks, Walter Long and Alfred Paget. Fairbanks role was uncredited, and was his first role in film, although his first starring role, in The Lamb, was released prior to this picture. The film features the siege of Béxar, the Battle of the Alamo, and the Battle of San Jacinto.

While making claims to historical accuracy, the film depicts the Mexican population in San Antonio in 1836 as a group of ill-mannered drunks.  One scene depicts a Mexican officer verbally assaulting a white woman and making advances on her.  The white woman reports the incident to her husband, Almeron Dickinson, who in turn shoots the Mexican officer.  In his book Remembering the Alamo, author Richard R. Flores, argues that the negative portrayal of the Mexican population is due to racism toward Mexicans in 1915, the year the film was produced. A copy of the film is preserved at the Library of Congress.

Cast 
 Sam De Grasse as Silent Smith (Deaf Smith)
 Allan Sears as David Crockett
 Walter Long as Santa Anna
 Alfred Paget as James Bowie
 Fred Burns as Almeron Dickinson
 John T. Dillon as Colonel Travis
 Douglas Fairbanks as Joe/Texan Soldier
 Juanita Hansen as Old Soldier's Daughter
 Ora Carew as Mrs. Dickinson
 Tom Wilson as Sam Houston
 Augustus Carney as Old Soldier

References

External links 

 
 

1915 films
1910s war drama films
1915 Western (genre) films
American war drama films
American black-and-white films
Films based on historical novels
Films directed by Christy Cabanne
Films set in Texas
Films set in the 1830s
American historical drama films
Texas Revolution films
Triangle Film Corporation films
1910s historical drama films
Davy Crockett
Siege films
1915 drama films
Films based on American novels
Silent American Western (genre) films
1910s American films
Silent war drama films
Silent American drama films